Chicken Lahori is a South Asian curry which originated in Lahore, Pakistan. Served with rice, chicken Lahori is a popular street food.

Preparation
Oil is heated in a large pan or wok, and whole spices are sautéed, including black and green cardamom, cumin seeds, bay leaves, coriander, and turmeric, in addition to garlic and onion. In these spices, the chicken is stewed in yogurt, served with basmati rice, and garnished with fresh coriander and garam masala.

See also
 List of chicken dishes
 Pakistani cuisine
 Pakistani meat dishes

References

External links

Lahori cuisine
Pakistani chicken dishes